Marshfield High School (MHS) is located in Marshfield, Massachusetts, United States.  It currently serves grades 9–12, and has a student population, as of 2013, of over 1300 students. The principal of the school is Robert E. Keuther. It is the only public high school in Marshfield, and there are no private high schools located in Marshfield.

History
The old building was built in 1969 and was demolished and replaced after the construction of a new building, which was finished in time for the 2014–2015 school year.

Notable clubs 
 Drama Club
 DECA
 Youth & Government
 Art Club
 Mock Trial
 Peer Leaders
 Key Club
 Creative Writing
 National Honor Society
 Project Reach
 AFS

Athletics

Football Accomplishments
 State Champions – 1995, 1996, 1998, 2009, 2014
 State Finalists – 1999, 2003, 2006, 2007, 2008
Cheerleading Accomplishments
 League Champions 2017
 Regional Champions 2017
 State Champions 2017
 National Champions 2017
Track and Field
National Champions DMR 2013

Notable alumni
 Jim Cantwell (1984): Massachusetts state representative for the 4th Plymouth district
 Chris Corcoran (2001): soccer defender in MLS and international leagues
  Becky DelosSantos (1987): Playboy Playmate of the Month for April 1994
Ryan Gibbons (2001): American football offensive lineman
 Sean Morey (1994): American football wide receiver in the NFL, drafted by the New England Patriots in 1999
 Sean Morris (2001): lacrosse player
 Zach Triner (2009): American football long snapper in the NFL for the Tampa Bay Buccaneers.
 David Warsofsky, NHL hockey player

References

Public high schools in Massachusetts
Schools in Plymouth County, Massachusetts